A gangway is a narrow passage that joins the quarterdeck to the forecastle of a sailing ship.  The term is also extended to mean the narrow passages used to board or disembark ships.

Modern shipping uses gangways to embark and disembark passengers. Twentieth century extendible gangways used in the Overseas Passenger Terminal in Sydney, Australia are now on the State's heritage list.

See also
 Jet bridge, a movable connector which extends from an airport terminal gate to an airplane
 Linkspan
 Walking the plank

References

Shipbuilding
Ship compartments